Taiwan Markis Jones (born December 1, 1993) is an American football linebacker who is currently a free agent. He played college football at Michigan State. Jones signed with the New York Jets as an undrafted free agent in 2015. The Michigan Panthers of the United States Football League drafted Jones with the eleventh pick in the twenty-first round of the 2022 USFL Draft.

Early years
Jones attended Anchor Bay High School in Michigan. Jones was ranked as the 30th best linebacker by Rivals.com and was ranked the 57th ranked linebacker by Scout.com. Jones was selected to the PrepStar's All-Midwest Team. Jones was named to the  all-state Division 1-2 first-team by The Detroit News and Associated Press. He was named to the all-county and all-conference teams in his senior season and also was named the Macomb Area Conference Blue Division MVP also in his senior season. Jones was a utility player at high school, where he played at running back, wide receiver and quarterback. Jones recorded 46 tackles and three interceptions in his 2010 season. Jones also played for the Anchor Bay basketball team in which he was a three-year starter. Jones was named an Associated Press Class A All-State honorable mention for the 2010-11 basketball season. He also named to the Detroit Free Press All-East Team in his senior season.

Professional career

According to NFLDraftScout.com, Jones was projected to go in the fifth round in the 2015 NFL Draft and his NFL comparisons were to NFL Linebacker Brandon Spikes and current Cincinnati Bengals linebacker Nico Johnson.

In May 2015, Jones signed with the New York Jets as an undrafted free agent following the conclusion of the 2015 NFL Draft. On December 18, 2015, he was promoted to the active roster.

On September 3, 2016, he was released by the Jets as part of final roster cuts. He was re-signed by the Jets on October 26, 2016. He was released again by the Jets on November 22, 2016.

On April 1, 2019, Jones signed a contract to play with the Memphis Express of the Alliance of American Football, only to learn of the league's suspension of operations the following day.

In October 2019, Jones was selected by the Los Angeles Wildcats in the 2020 XFL Draft's open phase. He had his contract terminated when the league suspended operations on April 10, 2020.

References

External links
Michigan State Spartans bio
New York Jets bio

1993 births
Living people
African-American players of American football
American football linebackers
People from New Baltimore, Michigan
Players of American football from Michigan
Michigan State Spartans football players
New York Jets players
Memphis Express (American football) players
Los Angeles Wildcats (XFL) players
Sportspeople from Metro Detroit
21st-century African-American sportspeople
Michigan Panthers (2022) players